Abudasse kale is a 1968 Sri Lankan film directed by Kumar Wickremasooriya.

Cast
Rukmani Devi
Malini Fonseka
Eddie Jayamanne
Vijitha Mallika
D.R. Nanayakkara

References

External links
Sri Lanka Cinema Database
 

1968 films
1960s Sinhala-language films